Crossotus inermis is a species of beetle in the family Cerambycidae. It was described by Breuning in 1935.

References

inermis
Beetles described in 1935